"Shakespeare's Sister" is a song by the English rock band the Smiths. Released in March 1985, it reached No. 26 in the UK Singles Chart. It is also featured on the compilation albums Louder Than Bombs and The World Won't Listen. The front cover to the single features former Coronation Street star Pat Phoenix, dressed up as her character Elsie Tanner.

Background
The title refers to a section of Virginia Woolf's feminist essay A Room of One's Own in which she argues that if William Shakespeare had had a sister of equal genius, as a woman she would not have had the opportunity to make use of it. Sean O'Hagan says that the essay was "one of the many feminist texts Morrissey embraced as a sexually confused, politically-awakened adolescent".

According to Simon Goddard, the lyrics also draw on Elizabeth Smart's novella By Grand Central Station I Sat Down and Wept and the Billy Fury song "Don't Jump". The song's narrative has been compared to The Glass Menagerie by Tennessee Williams, in which the character of Laura Wingfield is referred to as "Shakespeare's sister" by the character Jim O'Connor because the latter refers to Laura's brother Tom, an aspiring writer, as "Shakespeare."

Track listing

Artwork and matrix message
The original single's sleeve cover featured Pat Phoenix, best known for her long-running role as Elsie Tanner in the British soap opera Coronation Street.

The British 7" and 12" vinyls contained the matrix message: HOME IS WHERE THE ART IS/none

The Netherlands versions contained the message: HOLLAND CUTTING/none. "Holland cutting" was an etching on the Dutch version of the album Meat Is Murder.

Charts

Reception

In a retrospective review of the song, Jack Rabid of Allmusic wrote, "The Smiths' weakest is still quite good, is what we can infer from this. What wit Morrissey still shows, record after record? Who else is writing an opening line like 'Young bones groan/And the rocks below say/Throw your skinny body down, son!' – thus evoking the tragic Romeo and Juliet quality of so much teenage romance in the most poetic terms?"

Writer Jon Savage described it as "essentially a suicide drama set to a demented rock'n'roll rhythm".

Influence
The band Shakespears Sister  took their name from the song.

References

Songs with feminist themes
Songs about William Shakespeare
The Smiths songs
1985 singles
Songs written by Morrissey
Songs written by Johnny Marr
1985 songs
Rough Trade Records singles
UK Independent Singles Chart number-one singles
Rockabilly songs